1936 Olympics  may refer to:

The 1936 Winter Olympics, which were held in Garmisch-Partenkirchen, Germany
The 1936 Summer Olympics, which were held in Berlin, Germany